Pachymorphinae is a subfamily of stick insects in the family Phasmatidae. Genera are primarily found in Africa, Asia and Australia.

Tribes and genera 
The Phasmida Species File lists two tribes (Gratidiini has been moved):

Hemipachymorphini 
Authority: Günther, 1953

 Hemipachymorpha Kirby, 1904
 Pseudopromachus Günther, 1929
 Spinotectarchus Salmon, 1991
 Tectarchus Salmon, 1954

Pachymorphini 
Authority: Brunner von Wattenwyl, 1893
 Acanthoderus Gray, 1835
 Asteliaphasma Jewell & Brock, 2003
 Micrarchus Carl, 1913
 Miniphasma Zompro, 2007
 Niveaphasma Jewell & Brock, 2003
 Pachymorpha Gray, 1835

References

External links 

Phasmatidae
Phasmatodea subfamilies
Insects of Asia
Insects of Africa